Michael Bowden may refer to:
 Michael Bowden (footballer) (1947–2020), Australian rules footballer
 Michael Bowden (baseball) (born 1986), American baseball pitcher